NGC 957 (also known as Collinder 28) is a loosely bound open cluster located in the constellation Perseus. It has an apparent magnitude of 7.6 and an approximate size of 11 arc-minutes.

Location

NGC 957 lies 1.5º WNW of NGC 884, which itself is part of the larger Double Cluster. The stars Gamma Persei and Eta Persei point in the general direction of the open cluster.

See also
Trumpler 2 - a nearby open cluster

References

External links
 
CCD image of NGC 957, Velimir Popov & Emil Ivanov, 2018

Open clusters
957
Perseus (constellation)